Bamberg Church is a parish church of the Church of Norway in Levanger municipality in Trøndelag county, Norway. It is located in the Neset area of the town of Levanger. It is an annex church for the Levanger parish which is part of the Stiklestad prosti (deanery) in the Diocese of Nidaros. The church was built in 1998 and it was consecrated on 30 August 1998. From 1998 until 2015 the building was also used as the parish nursery school.

See also
List of churches in Nidaros

References

Levanger
Churches in Trøndelag
Wooden churches in Norway
Rectangular churches in Norway
20th-century Church of Norway church buildings
Churches completed in 1998
1998 establishments in Norway